Mohammed Ali Karim (born June 25, 1986 in Iraq) is an Iraqi football defender. He currently coaches Iraq U16 as assistant.

Club career
Mohammed Ali Kareem has established himself as one of the most promising players in Iraq. Born in June 1986, he started his playing career as a teenager in 2005 with Bagdad-based Al Shorta, where he spent two years honing his skills and gaining valuable experience. 
2007 he was signed by Jordanian giants Al Jazeera Amman, where he spent a season before returning to his homeland for short stints with Al Shorta again and Al-Quwa Al-Jawiya followed by a lucrative move to the Abu Dhabi-based Al Jazira. He then moved to Al Zawraa and in October 2010 he moved back to Al Shorta, where he was given the number 2 shirt, after Samal Saeed left Al Shorta. In March 2011 Mohammed Ali Karim signed on a contract with Arbil SC. Shortly after Mohammed signed with Al-Zawra'a SC before signing for Talaba SC in 2012

International career
Kareem broke into Iraq's Olympic side (U23) and played a key defensive role in the silver-winning campaign at the 2006 Asian Games at Doha.
Karim earned his first senior call-up in 2008 under Adnan Hamad and featured in three of the Iraqis' six qualifying games in Asia's third stage of qualifying for the 2010 FIFA World Cup South Africa, including the 1–0 victory over Australia.

Honours

Country 
 2006 Asian Games Silver medallist.

Club 
Erbil
 Iraqi Premier League: 2011–12
Al-Quwa Al-Jawiya
 Iraq FA Cup: 2015–16

References

External links 

Profile on Goalzz

1986 births
Iraq international footballers
Iraqi expatriate footballers
Iraqi footballers
2009 FIFA Confederations Cup players
2011 AFC Asian Cup players
Sportspeople from Baghdad
Living people
Asian Games medalists in football
Footballers at the 2006 Asian Games
Al-Shorta SC players
Asian Games silver medalists for Iraq
Association football fullbacks
Medalists at the 2006 Asian Games